HNoMS Tor was a  destroyer of the Royal Norwegian Navy that was launched in September 1939. She was under outfitting and testing when Nazi Germany invaded Norway on 9 April 1940. Although scuttled by Norwegian naval personnel to prevent her from being captured by the invading forces, she was soon salvaged by the Germans and put into service with the Kriegsmarine. Under the name Tiger she served out the war as an escort and training vessel, being recovered by the Norwegians in Denmark after the German capitulation in 1945. After the war she was converted to a frigate and served until 1959.

Construction
As part of the Norwegian rearmament scheme in the last years leading up to the Second World War, the Royal Norwegian Navy began building a series of new destroyers. The six ships of the Sleipner class were larger than the preceding First World War vintage  vessels. At some 735 tons the Sleipner-class ships were still much smaller than the destroyers of the major navies of the time. The Royal Norwegian Navy had requested 1,000 ton destroyers, but financial constraints led to the 735-ton Sleipner class being constructed as a compromise. The Sleipner-class design focused on anti-surface and anti-aircraft artillery, and modern anti-submarine equipment. The ships did however suffer from insufficient range and seaworthiness.

The construction of Tor was financed through the extraordinary appropriations to the Norwegian Armed Forces following the outbreak of the Second World War. The funds were intended to improve the armed forces' ability to protect Norwegian neutrality against violations by the warring parties. While all five of her sister ships were constructed at the Royal Norwegian Navy's main naval yard at Karljohansvern in Horten, Tor was built at Fredrikstad Mekaniske Verksted in Fredrikstad. Her keel was laid in November 1938. The penultimate ship of the Sleipner class, she was launched on 7 September 1939.

The successful launch of Tor at Fredrikstad Mekaniske Verksted led member of parliament from the Conservative Party, naval captain Trygve Sverdrup, in a closed meeting of the Parliament of Norway on 11 March 1940, to argue for further Sleipner-class ships to be rapidly constructed at the shipyard in order to improve the numbers of the Royal Norwegian Navy.

Second World War

German invasion and scuttling
By the time of the 9 April 1940 German invasion of Norway, Tor had received her crew and begun her trials and shakedown cruises. She had however not yet had any of her armament installed, and was still in the process of fitting out. When it was reported on 9 April that German forces were approaching Fredrikstad, the commander, Captain Ewald Røren, ordered that she was to be scuttled at the shipyard, rather than to be abandoned intact to the advancing Germans. The crew of Tor made their way inland, joining the Norwegian 1st Division in Østfold and eventually following it into internment in neutral Sweden. The 1st Division's retreat across the border occurred on 14 April 1940, after confused fighting beginning on 12 April.

German service

Salvage
After their capture of Fredrikstad, the Germans immediately began work on salvaging the scuttled Norwegian warship. On 16 April, a week after her scuttling, Tor was raised from the harbour. Six days later, on 22 April, the Germans moved her to Drammen for repairs and fitting out. The work on Tor, and her sister ship , was completed during the summer of 1940 at Karljohansvern naval yard in Horten. The completion of the two destroyers was the first work carried out by the state-owned Norwegian naval yard for the German occupants during the Second World War. Tor had yard number 128 at Karljohansvern.

As Tiger
On 13 June 1940 the Germans commissioned Tor into the Kriegsmarine, renaming her Tiger, and re-designating her as a torpedo boat.

In German service Tiger was made part of the 7th Torpedo Boat Flotilla; initially carrying out escort duties in the Skagerrak and Kattegat. The fellow captured Norwegian Sleipner-class destroyers  (Löwe),  (Panther) and Balder (Leopard) also formed part of the same flotilla. The first German commander of Tor was Kapitänleutnant Herbert Juttner, who commanded her until relieved in June 1941 by Oberleutnant zur See Friedrich Nose.

From July to December 1940 Tiger functioned as a training ship with the 7th Torpedo Boat Flotilla. When that unit was disbanded she was transferred to the 27th U-boat Flotilla in Gotenhafen as a torpedo recovery vessel. Tiger spent the rest of the war with the 27th U-boat Flotilla, being recovered in Korsør, Denmark in May 1945 and returned to the Royal Norwegian Navy.

Post-war service
After she rejoined the Royal Norwegian Navy Tor was given her old name back, and on 19 September 1946 was allocated the pennant number L.04. In the force lists provided to the Norwegian Parliament in 1946, Tor, her three sister ships, two  ships and a vessel still under construction at Karljohansvern were listed as escort destroyers. In 1948 Tor and the four other Sleipner-class vessels that had survived the war, were rebuilt as frigates. During the 1950s Tor was issued with the NATO pennant number F.303. In 1959 Tor and her surviving sister ships were all written off and sold for scrapping.

Notes

Citations

Bibliography
 
 
 
 
 
 
 
 
 
 
 
 
 
 

1939 ships
Naval ships of Norway captured by Germany during World War II
Ships built in Fredrikstad
Ships built in Horten
World War II shipwrecks in the North Sea
Sleipner-class destroyers
World War II destroyers of Norway
Frigates of the Royal Norwegian Navy
Maritime incidents in April 1940
Ships sunk with no fatalities
Scuttled vessels